Shahab District is a district (bakhsh) in Qeshm County, Hormozgan Province, Iran. At the 2006 census, its population was 30,112, in 6,319 families.  The District has one city: Suza. The District has five rural districts (dehestan): Dulab Rural District, Hengam Rural District, Larak Rural District, Salakh Rural District, and Suza Rural District.

References 

Districts of Hormozgan Province
Qeshm County